Mordellistena amurensis is a species of beetle in the family Mordellidae. It is in the genus Mordellistena. It was discovered in 1982.

References

amurensis
Beetles described in 1982